Eddy Capron (born 15 January 1971) is a retired French professional footballer who played as a defender.

External links
 
 

1971 births
Living people
French footballers
Association football defenders
FC Nantes players
Stade Rennais F.C. players
CS Sedan Ardennes players
Le Mans FC players
Ligue 1 players